Afropelastoneurus is a genus of flies in the family Dolichopodidae. It includes five species from Africa formerly placed in Paracleius or Pelastoneurus (the former is now a synonym of the latter).

Species
 Afropelastoneurus fernandopoensis (Grichanov, 2004)
 Afropelastoneurus irinae (Grichanov, 2004)
 Afropelastoneurus martius (Grichanov, 2004)
 Afropelastoneurus pontifex (Parent, 1937)
 Afropelastoneurus umbricola (Parent, 1936)

References

Dolichopodidae genera
Dolichopodinae
Diptera of Africa